The following timeline of twentieth-century theatre offers a year-by-year account of the performance and publication of notable works of drama and significant events in the history of theatre during the 20th century. Musical theatre works are excluded from the list below.


1900

1901

1902

1903

1904

1905

1906

1907

1908

1909

1910

1911

1912

1913

1914

1915

1916

1917

1918

1919

1920

1921

1922

1923

1924

1925

1926

1927

1928

1929

1930

1931

1932

1933

1934

1935

1936

1937

1938

1939

1940

1941

1942

1943

1944

1945

1946

1947

1948

1949

1950

1951

1952

1953

1954

1955

1956

1957

1958

1959

1960

References

Timeline
Theatre 20th
Theatre-related lists